Amreli district is one of the 33 administrative districts of the state of Gujarat in western India. The district headquarters are located at Amreli. The district occupies an area of 6,760 km2 and has a population of 1,514,190 of which 22.45% were urban (as of 2011). Amreli is the land of Yogiji Maharaj(Dhari), Danbapu, Sage Muldas, Sage Bhojalrambapa, Sage Muktanand Swami, Magician K.Lal, Zaverchand Megahani's place (Bagasara), Dr. Jivaraj Mehata etc. Amreli covers Dhari Gir National forest sanctuary area. Now it is developing as a Hub of Education.

Origin of name
Amreli district name derives its name from the town of Amreli, which is the headquarters of the district. It is believed that during the year 534 AD, Amreli existed as a city place with name Anumanji. After that the name was Amlik and then Amravati. The ancient Sanskrit name of Amreli was Amarvalli.

History 

Initially, Amreli was a small village with an ancient history, and part of various kingdoms and empires established in the area. It shot into prominence, turning from village to town, when the Marathas began acquiring territory and establishing their reign over the region in 1780s. Besides levying taxes on the other rulers of the Kathiawar Peninsula, the Gaekwads also acquired their own territory and chose Amreli as the headquarters for their "Kathewad Pranth", which included Dwarka mandal. Vithalrao Devaji was appointed the Diwan (1801–1820), and during this period, Amreli grew and prospered. Vithalrao Devaji converted much of the adjoining forest land into farm land to realise revenue and also built the Nagnath Mahadev temple. Later in 1886, under the Gaikwad regime, compulsory and free education policy was adopted in Amreli for the first time. From 18th century to 1959, Dwarika and Okhamandal was part of Gaikwad - Amreli state but after 1959, those two cities were merged with Jamnagar district.

During the British Raj, the Maratha Gaekwad dynasty organised its Baroda State into four administrative prants (equivalent to British Districts), namely Baroda itself, Kadi (the largest), Navsari and Amreli, the smallest.

After independence the district became the part of Bombay State and a separate district in Gujarat State after the bifurcation of Bombay State.

Geography
Amreli has a variety of soils such as Medium black, loamy, sandy, rocky inferior and saline.

Politics
  

|}

Economy

Amreli district is industrially backward area. There are some small industries like oil mills spread over the district.

The economy depends upon agriculture. Agro-based industries are also well developed in the district. Mainly groundnut, cotton, sesame, bajri, wheat, and grams are grown therein. Fishery is an important sector in Rajula and Jafrabad talukas.

The district has 4 industrial estates under the GIDC (Gujarat Industrial Development Centres), two of which are in Babra. District has 4822 Small Scale Industries and 5 Medium Scale Industries in which Rs.4947.35 lakh is invested. 16,640 employments are generated through this industrial centres. Pipavav, Jafrabad and Victor ports are situated in the coastal district.

Gems
Gem cutting and polishing industries are located in Babra, while Savar Kundla taluka is famous for its Manual weighing Scales-Electronic Weighing machines across the country. Gold plating units in Bagasara city. The diamond trading industry is also well developed. small gem cutting industry located in Dhari

Mining
Rajula is famous for rajula stones which are famous worldwide.

Ginning
Babra is famous for Ginning industry with more than 50 ginning and pressing factories.

Talukas
The district comprises 11 talukas.
 Amreli
Babra
 Dhari
 Vadia
 Lathi
 Lilia
 Savar Kundla
 Khambha
 Rajula
 Jafrabad
 Bagasara

Villages
 
 
Hathigadh

Demographics

According to the 2011 census Amreli district has a population of 1,514,190, roughly equal to the nation of Gabon or the US state of Hawaii. This gives it a ranking of 329th in India (out of a total of 640). Its population growth rate over the decade 2001-2011 was 8.59%. Amreli has a sex ratio of 964 females for every 1000 males, and a literacy rate of 74.49%. 386,635 (25.53%) lived in urban areas. Scheduled Castes and Scheduled Tribes make up 8.78% and 0.48% of the population respectively.

Hindus are 93.15% while Muslims are 6.55% of the population.

Gujarati is the predominant language, spoken by 99.01% of the population.

Cities and Towns 
The population development of the cities and towns in Amreli.

Culture
The most popular temples in the city of Amreli are Nagnath Temple, Gayatri Temple and Shreenathji Haveli. The other tourist places in Amreli district are Tulshishyam-Una(via dhari), Sarkeshvar Mahadev, Balana (Jafarabad), Delvada, Holi-Dharin Nana Visavadar, Vakuni-Dhar, Hanuman Gada, Satadhar, Galadhara-Khodiyar Temple and Khodiyar dam(Dhari). Kankai-banej and diu.ambardi safari park (Dhari) is most tourist attractions place in amreli district.

Notable people
 Bhoja Bhagat - poet-saint
 Hanu Dhorajiya - politician.
 Yogiji Maharaj - Hindu sadhu and guru
 Jivraj Narayan Mehta - first Chief Minister of Gujarat
 Ramesh Parekh, famous poet of Gujarat. 
 Kalapi - writer & poet and was also Thakor of Lathi.
 Kavi Kant - poet
 Manubhai Kotadia - politician.
 Muktanand Swami - sadhu and paramahansa of Swaminarayan sampraday.
 Savji Dholakia - diamond merchant from Surat and the founder of Hari Krishna Exports Pvt. Ltd.

See also
 Amreli Steels

Notes

References

External links

 Official website
 Amreli district collector website

 
Districts of Gujarat